The superior nasal concha is a small, curved plate of bone representing a medial bony process of the labyrinth of the ethmoid bone. The superior nasal concha forms the roof of the superior nasal meatus.

Anatomy

Anatomical relations 
The superior nasal concha is situated posterosuperiorly to the middle nasal concha. It forms the superior boundary of the superior nasal meatus. Superior to the superior nasal concha is the sphenoethmoidal recess where the sphenoid sinus communicates with the nasal cavity; the sphenoethmoidal recess is interposed between the superior nasal concha, and (the anterior aspect of) the body of sphenoid bone.

See also
 Nasal concha

Additional images

References

External links
 
 upstate.edu - Frontal
  - lateral
  - coronal

Bones of the head and neck